Bill Farmer (born 1952) is an American voice actor and comedian.

Bill, Billy, or William Farmer may also refer to:

Bill Farmer (public servant) (born 1947), an Australian public servant and policymaker
Bill Farmer (baseball) (1864–1928), a professional baseball player
William M. Farmer (1853–1931), an American jurist and politician
William R. Farmer (1929–2000), an American professor of theology
William Wood Farmer (1813–1854), lieutenant governor of Louisiana from 1853–1854
William Farmer (runner), a participant in the 2009 Laugavegur Ultramarathon
Billy Farmer, a character in the comic The Leopard from Lime Street